The United States presidential election in Arkansas, 1968 was held on November 5th, 1968 as part of the 1968 United States presidential election. American Independent candidate George Wallace won the state of Arkansas with 235,627 votes, with Republican Richard Nixon winning 189,062 and Democrat Hubert Humphrey winning 184,901.

With 38.65% of the popular vote, Arkansas would prove to be Wallace's weakest state that he carried in the 1968 election after Alabama, Mississippi, Louisiana and Georgia. This was the first time since 1872 that Arkansas did not vote for the Democratic candidate, and would be the last time until 2008 that Arkansas did not back the winner of the presidential election. As of 2020, this remains the last election in which the Republican nominee won the presidency without carrying Arkansas, as well as the last time Arkansas voted for a different candidate than neighboring Missouri. Arkansas is the only state in the union that flipped from Lyndon B. Johnson to George Wallace between 1964 and 1968. The rest of Wallace's victories were achieved in states that backed Barry Goldwater four years earlier. This was the only state outside of the Deep South to vote for Wallace.

Results

Results by county

See also
 United States presidential elections in Arkansas

Notes

References

Arkansas
1968 Arkansas elections
1968